Out of the City is a Czech comedy film directed by Tomáš Vorel. It was released in 2000. Out of the City is Vorel's fourth feature film.

Plot
A programmer named Honza decides to clear his head over the weekend from his hectic job, picks up his ex-wife's son, and together they set off on a trip into the countryside. Their civilization is highlighted in the film using mobile phone, laptop and digital camera. They become familiar with a charming country girl named Markéta and her grandmother, who live in a house with scented herbs and homemade liqueurs. A weekend trip stretches to several weeks stay in the small village. Honza and his son spend the most beautiful and gayest moments of their life in the country. The film is a parade of quirky rural characters. Honza's absence from work and his son from school is not without consequences, and father and son are forced to return to civilization. But Honza cannot forget his weeks in the country, or the girl Margaret.

Cast and characters
 Tomáš Hanák as Honza
 Barbora Nimcová as Markéta
 Michal Vorel as Honzík
 Anezka Kusiaková as Anicka
 Luba Skořepová as Granny
 Bolek Polívka as Ludva
 Eva Holubová as Vlastička, Ludva's wife
 Leoš Suchařípa as Beekeeper
 Alena Stréblová as Helena
 David Vávra as Jarda
 Jirí Burda as Coachman (as Jirí Hruska)
 Milan Šteindler as Hunter
 Radomil Uhlir
 Petr Čtvrtníček
 Tomáš Vorel Jr. as Ludva's son
 Daniela Kolářová as Markéta's mother

Music 
In the film we see several original songs, Cesta z města (The Way of the City), Dva skřítci (Two Elves), and also a choral passage of the Easter responsory O Filii et Filiae by Jean Tisserand (only a Czech text is used here, the music differs from the original).

References

External links
 

2000 films
2000 comedy films
Czech comedy films
2000s Czech films